IEEE 802.11ac-2013 or 802.11ac is a wireless networking standard in the IEEE 802.11 set of protocols (which is part of the Wi-Fi networking family), providing high-throughput wireless local area networks (WLANs) on the 5 GHz band. The standard has been retroactively labelled as Wi-Fi 5 by Wi-Fi Alliance.

The specification has multi-station throughput of at least 1.1 gigabit per second (1.1 Gbit/s) and single-link throughput of at least 500 megabits per second (0.5 Gbit/s). This is accomplished by extending the air-interface concepts embraced by 802.11n: wider RF bandwidth (up to 160 MHz), more MIMO spatial streams (up to eight), downlink multi-user MIMO (up to four clients), and high-density modulation (up to 256-QAM).

The Wi-Fi Alliance separated the introduction of ac wireless products into two phases ("waves"), named "Wave 1" and "Wave 2". From mid-2013, the alliance started certifying Wave 1 802.11ac products shipped by manufacturers, based on the IEEE 802.11ac Draft 3.0 (the IEEE standard was not finalized until later that year). Subsequently in 2016, Wi-Fi Alliance introduced the Wave 2 certification, which includes additional features like MU-MIMO (down-link only), 160 MHz channel width support, support for more 5 GHz channels, and four spatial streams (with four antennas; compared to three in Wave 1 and 802.11n, and eight in IEEE's 802.11ax specification). It meant Wave 2 products would have higher bandwidth and capacity than Wave 1 products.

New technologies
New technologies introduced with 802.11ac include the following:
 Extended channel binding
 Optional 160 MHz and mandatory 80 MHz channel bandwidth for stations; cf. 40 MHz maximum in 802.11n.
 More MIMO spatial streams
 Support for up to eight spatial streams (vs. four in 802.11n)
 Downlink multi-user MIMO (MU-MIMO, allows up to four simultaneous downlink MU-MIMO clients)
 Multiple STAs, each with one or more antennas, transmit or receive independent data streams simultaneously.
 Space-division multiple access (SDMA): streams not separated by frequency, but instead resolved spatially, analogous to 11n-style MIMO.
 Downlink MU-MIMO (one transmitting device, multiple receiving devices) included as an optional mode.
 Modulation
 256-QAM, rate 3/4 and 5/6, added as optional modes (vs. 64-QAM, rate 5/6 maximum in 802.11n).
 Some vendors offer a non-standard 1024-QAM mode, providing 25% higher data rate compared to 256-QAM
 Other elements/features
 Beamforming with standardized sounding and feedback for compatibility between vendors (non-standard in 802.11n made it hard for beamforming to work effectively between different vendor products)
 MAC modifications (mostly to support above changes)
 Coexistence mechanisms for 20, 40, 80, and 160 MHz channels, 11ac and 11a/n devices
 Adds four new fields to the PPDU header identifying the frame as a very high throughput (VHT) frame as opposed to 802.11n's high throughput (HT) or earlier. The first three fields in the header are readable by legacy devices to allow coexistence

Features

Mandatory
 Borrowed from the 802.11a/802.11g specifications:
 800 ns regular guard interval
 Binary convolutional coding (BCC)
 Single spatial stream
 Newly introduced by the 802.11ac specification:
 80 MHz channel bandwidths

Optional
 Borrowed from the 802.11n specification:
 Two to four spatial streams
 Low-density parity-check code (LDPC)
 Space–time block coding (STBC)
 Transmit beamforming (TxBF)
 400 ns short guard interval (SGI)
 Newly introduced by the 802.11ac specification:
 five to eight spatial streams
 160 MHz channel bandwidths (contiguous 80+80)
 80+80 MHz channel bonding (discontiguous 80+80)
 MCS 8/9 (256-QAM)

New scenarios and configurations
The single-link and multi-station enhancements supported by 802.11ac enable several new WLAN usage scenarios, such as simultaneous streaming of HD video to multiple clients throughout the home, rapid synchronization and backup of large data files, wireless display, large campus/auditorium deployments, and manufacturing floor automation.

With the inclusion of USB 3.0 interface, 802.11ac access points and routers can use locally attached storage to provide various services that fully utilize their WLAN capacities, such as video streaming, FTP servers, and personal cloud services.  With storage locally attached through USB 2.0, filling the bandwidth made available by 802.11ac was not easily accomplished.

Example configurations
All rates assume 256-QAM, rate 5/6:

Wave 1 vs. Wave 2
Wave 2, referring to products introduced in 2016, offers a higher throughput than legacy Wave 1 products, those introduced starting in 2013. The maximum physical layer theoretical rate for Wave 1 is 1.3 Gbit/s, while Wave 2 can reach 2.34 Gbit/s. Wave 2 can therefore achieve 1 Gbit/s even if the real world throughput turns out to be only 50% of the theoretical rate. Wave 2 also supports a higher number of connected devices.

Data rates and speed

Several companies are currently offering 802.11ac chipsets with higher modulation rates: MCS-10 and MCS-11 (1024-QAM), supported by Quantenna and Broadcom. Although technically not part of 802.11ac, these new MCS indices became official in the 802.11ax standard, ratified in 2021.

160 MHz channels are unavailable in some countries due to regulatory issues that allocated some frequencies for other purposes.

Advertised speeds
802.11ac-class device wireless speeds are often advertised as AC followed by a number, that number being the highest link rates in Mbit/s of all the simultaneously-usable radios in the device added up.  For example, an AC1900 access point might have 600 Mbit/s capability on its 2.4 GHz radio and 1300 Mbit/s capability on its 5 GHz radio.  No single client device could connect and achieve 1900 Mbit/s of throughput, but separate devices each connecting to the 2.4 GHz and 5 GHz radios could achieve combined throughput approaching 1900 Mbit/s.  Different possible stream configurations can add up to the same AC number.

Products

Commercial routers and access points
Quantenna released the first 802.11ac chipset for retail Wi-Fi routers and consumer electronics on November 15, 2011. Redpine Signals released the first low power 802.11ac technology for smartphone application processors on December 14, 2011. On January 5, 2012, Broadcom announced its first 802.11ac Wi-Fi chips and partners and on April 27, 2012, Netgear announced the first Broadcom-enabled router. On May 14, 2012, Buffalo Technology released the world’s first 802.11ac products to market, releasing a wireless router and client bridge adapter. On December 6, 2012, Huawei announced commercial availability of the industry's first enterprise-level 802.11ac Access Point.

Motorola Solutions is selling 802.11ac access points including the AP 8232. In April 2014, Hewlett-Packard started selling the HP 560 access point in the controller-based WLAN enterprise market segment.

Commercial laptops
On June 7, 2012, it was reported that Asus had unveiled its ROG G75VX gaming notebook, which would be the first consumer-oriented notebook to be fully compliant with 802.11ac (albeit in its "draft 2.0" version).

Apple began implementing 802.11ac starting with the MacBook Air in June 2013, followed by the MacBook Pro and Mac Pro later that year.

 Hewlett-Packard incorporates 802.11ac compliance in laptop computers.

Commercial handsets (partial list)

Commercial tablets

Chipsets

Notes

Comparison

See also
 IEEE 802.11ad

References

External links
 802.11ac Technology Introduction white paper 
 MIMO 802.11ac Test Architectures
 802.11ac: The Fifth Generation of Wi-Fi Technical Paper
 802.11ac primer
 Intel Wireless Products Selection Guide

ac-2013